Kennedy Wong Ying-ho BBS, JP (born 23 February 1963 in Hong Kong) is a Hong Kong solicitor. He is a solicitor of the Supreme Court of Hong Kong. He was also the member of the Provisional Legislative Council which existed from 1996 to 98 and councillor of the Hong Kong Baptist University. He was the part-time member of the government's Central Policy Unit from 2002 to 2004 and the member of the Chinese People's Political Consultative Conference National Committee.

In December 2021, it was reported that Wong had a "privileged" vote in the 2021 Hong Kong legislative election, where the vote would count approximately 7,215 times more than an ordinary citizen.

According to Wong's January 2022 declaration of assets, he owns shares in about 40 separate companies.

In July 2022, Wong was one of 18 DAB lawmakers who argued that businesspeople should have their own quarantine hotel rooms in Shenzhen, separate from the rest of the population going from Hong Kong to Shenzhen, who use a ballot system to allocate rooms.

In August 2022, Wong announced that he would travel to Indonesia to clarify misconceptions about Hong Kong, and discuss "the true situation in Hong Kong, because unfortunately the international media has not properly reported the whole situation, in particular what really happened in 2019 and what the Hong Kong government as well as different sectors are [doing] to bring us to the next level."

References

External link

1963 births
Living people
Alumni of the University of Kent
Delegates to the 14th National People's Congress from Hong Kong
Democratic Alliance for the Betterment and Progress of Hong Kong politicians
HK LegCo Members 2022–2025
Hong Kong pro-Beijing politicians
Members of the 13th Chinese People's Political Consultative Conference
Members of the Election Committee of Hong Kong, 2007–2012
Members of the Election Committee of Hong Kong, 2012–2017
Members of the National Committee of the Chinese People's Political Consultative Conference
Members of the Provisional Legislative Council
New Century Forum politicians
Recipients of the Bronze Bauhinia Star
Solicitors of Hong Kong